Shaykh Abul Wafa Al Afghani is one of the former Shaykh Ul Fiqh of Jamia Nizamia, Hyderabad. He was known for his contributions to Islamic sciences (particularly concerning the Hanafi School of jurisprudence).

Birth and education

He was born on 10th Dhul Hijjah, 1310 Hijri (June 24, 1893 CE) in Kandahar in Afghanistan (hence the epithet Al Afghani). His full name is Syed Mahmood Shah Qadri Hanafi. His father's name is Syed Mubarak Shah Qadri Hanafi. He completed his introductory education under his father himself. At a young age, he came to India. He studied in Rampur, in Gujarat and reached Hyderabad and enrolled in Jamia Nizamia. He graduated from here in 1330 Hijri.

In Jamia Nizamia, Abul Wafa studied under great scholars of the time like Shaykh Ul Islam Imam Muhammad Anwaarullah Farooqui, the founder of Jamia Nizamia and Daairatul Ma'arif Al 'Uthmania, Shaykh 'Abdul Samad, Shaykh 'Abdul Kareem, Shaykh Muhammad Yaqoob, Shaykh Muqri Muhammad 'Ayud, Shaykh Ruknuddin, the first Mufti of Jamia Nizamia and others. After graduating from Jamia Nizamia, Abul Wafa was appointed as a teacher in Jamia Nizamia.

Establishment of Ihya Al Ma'arif An Nomaniya

Abul Wafa established Al Ihya Al Ma'arif An Nomaniya to publish rare books of Islamic sciences, especially those pertaining to the Hanafi School of jurisprudence.

Whatever manuscripts and rare books he needed, he would write letters to all the scholars he knew and seek their cooperation. Thus, Abul Wafa had an extensive collection of books on Hanafi jurisprudence, Hadith and its narrators, history and other Islamic sciences.

Books published by Ihya Al Ma'arif An Nomaniya

Many rare books have been published through this organization. They include:

 Kitaab Ul Aathaar (authored by Imam Abu Yousuf)
 Al Raddu 'Ala Siyaril Auzaa'i (authored by Imam Abu Yousuf)
 Kitabu Ikhtilaafi Abi Hanifa Wa Abi Ya'ala (authored by Imam Abu Yousuf)
 Kitaab Ul Asl (authored by Imam Muhammad bin Hasan al Shaybani)
 Al Jame' Ul Kabeer (authored by Imam Muhammad bin Hasan al Shaybani)
 Sharh Kitaab Ul Aathaar (authored by Imam Muhammad bin Hasan al Shaybani)
 And many more

Books worked on by Abul Wafa Al Afghani

Apart from the aforementioned works, the Shaykh also worked on the following books:

 Mukhtasar At Tahawi – In a single huge volume
 Research work on the 3rd volume of Tarikh Al Kabeer of Imam Bukhari
 An Nafaqaat by Imam Jassas
 Usool Ul Fiqh by Sarkhasi
 Sharh Uz Ziyadaat – In 2 volumes
 Manaqibi Abi Hanifa Wa Sahibaihi Yousuf Wa Muhammad by Imam Dhahabi
 Al Hujjah 'Ala Ahlil Madeenah of Imam Muhammad bin Hasan Ash Shaibani. This book was researched by Mufti Mehdi Hasan. This book was published in 4 volumes under the supervision of Abul Wafa.
 Akhbaari Abi Haneefa Wa Ashaabihee by Imam Muhaddith Qadhi Abi 'Abdullah (Dec. 436 Hijri)
 'Uqoodul Jimaan Fi Manaqibi Abi Hanifa An Nomaan by Hafidh Muhaddith Muhammad bin Yousuf Salhi Shafa'ee of Damascus
Abi Bakr Muhammadb. Ahmadb. Abi Sahl al-Sarakhsi, Usul al-Sarakhsi, Abu al-Wafa al-Afghani ed. ( Istanbul: Kahraman yay, 1984 )
Kitaab al-Athar of Imam al-Qadi Abu Yusuf (d. 182)
Kitaab al-Radd ala Siyr al-Awzaee of Imam al-Qadi Abu Yusuf
Kitaab Ikhtilaaf abi Hanifah wa Ibn Abi Layla of al-Imam Qadi Abu Yusuf
Kitab al-Asl of al-Imam Muhammad bin Hasan al-Shaybani (d. 187), a very useful book. Has the fiqh of Jihad.
Jami al-Kabir of al-Imam Muhammad bin Hasan.
Sharh Kitaab al-Athaar of Imam Muhammad bin Hasan

Personal life of Abul Wafa Al Afghani

Abul Wafa Afghani never married. Shaykh Abul Fatah Abul Ghudda who visited him writes:  There was nothing in his house except books, manuscripts and writings. These books would be spread all around him. Abul Wafa would have only a few morsels at night and his nights would be spent supplicating Allah.

Association with Muhaddith-e-Deccan

Abul Wafa was very close to Muhaddith-e-Deccan Abul Hasanaat Syed 'Abdullah Shah Naqshbandi Mujaddidi Qadri, the author of Zujaajatul Masabeeh. The author of Tadhkira Muhaddith-e-Deccan, Abul Fida Abdul Sattar Khan Naqshbandi Mujaddidi Qadri, the caliph of Abul Hasanaat writes:  Hadhrat Abul Wafa told me that I am indeed fortunate to have a perfect spiritual mentor in Hadhrat Abul Hasanaat. Otherwise, I would have had to travel to find a perfect Shaykh.

Death of Abul Wafa

Abul Wafa Al Afghani spent all his life in the quest to spread Islamic knowledge. He died on the morning of 13th Rajab, 1395 Hijri (12 July 1975 CE).

See also
 Shaykh Ul Islam Imam Muhammad Anwaarullah Farooqui
 Jamia Nizamia
 Muhammad Hamidullah
 Islamic scholar

References

External links
Zia Islamic Profile of Shaikh Afghani

20th-century Muslim scholars of Islam
Hanafis
Maturidis
Sunni Muslim scholars of Islam
Indian Sunni Muslim scholars of Islam
Afghan religion academics
Jamia Nizamia alumni